Epipleoneura is a genus of Neotropic damselflies in the Protoneuridae family.

Species
Epipleoneura albuquerquei
Epipleoneura angeloi Pessacq & Costa, 2010
Epipleoneura capilliformis
Epipleoneura demarmelsi
Epipleoneura fernandezi
Epipleoneura fuscaenea
Epipleoneura haroldoi
Epipleoneura humeralis
Epipleoneura kaxuriana
Epipleoneura lamina Williamson, 1915
Epipleoneura machadoi
Epipleoneura manauensis
Epipleoneura metallica
Epipleoneura ocuene
Epipleoneura pallida
Epipleoneura pereirai
Epipleoneura peruviensis
Epipleoneura solitaria
Epipleoneura spatulata
Epipleoneura tariana
Epipleoneura uncinata
Epipleoneura venezuelensis
Epipleoneura waiwaiana
Epipleoneura westfalli
Epipleoneura williamsoni Santos

Species

Protoneuridae